The Cat Who Lived with Anne Frank is a 2019 children's book by David Lee Miller and Steven Jay Rubin, illustrated by Elizabeth Baddeley. It details the events leading up to the Holocaust, through the eyes of Mouschi, a cat who lived with Anne Frank.

Mentioned in her diary, The Diary of a Young Girl, Mouschi was a real cat who belonged to Peter, the teenage boy also in hiding with Anne. Anne Frank was forced to leave her own cat, Moortje, behind after the Nazi invasion.

Synopsis
The book details a brief period in the life of Anne Frank's cat, Mouschi, from the period in which he meets Anne to the period of Nazi uprisings and the forced hiding with the family. While Anne, described as being "bright, kind and loving," must remain in hiding, Mouschi can wander the streets and view the onset of World War II from an unnoticed vantage point.

Reception
School Library Journal, in a review of The Cat Who Lived with Anne Frank, wrote "This gentle introduction to one of the darkest times in modern history ... can also provide a starting point for more in-depth study, reading, and discussion." The Jewish Book Council wrote "A gentle but effective introduction to one aspect of the Holocaust, and to this well-known family. ... an independent read for those at the upper end of the age range. It is an excellent resource for introducing the Holocaust in classrooms."

References

2019 children's books
American picture books
Books about Anne Frank